London Bridge attack can refer to:

 1884 London Bridge attack
 1992 London Bridge bombing
 2017 London Bridge attack
 2019 London Bridge stabbing